Park Kyung-lim (Korean: 박경림; born March 30, 1979) is a South Korean entertainer, comedian and actress known for her wit and kind behavior. After leaving to go to school in the United States at the New York Film Academy School of Film & Acting, she returned to regain her popularity as an MC for SBS's popular show, Good Sunday: X-Man!. She left the show in 2006 in order to host various MBC shows, as well as hosting her own radio show. She was a permanent member of High-Five, part of KBS's Happy Sunday lineup, until its cancellation in 2008. Park also hosted her own show entitled Park Kyung-lim's Wonderful Outing on MBC Every1. She appeared as a host for the show Thank You for Waking Us Up! and Thank You for Raising Me Up! with SS501.

In 2016, it was announced that Park would be a host on the Netflix reality show Ultimate Beastmaster along with comedian Seo Kyung-seok.

Private life 
She married Park Jung-hoon at the Shilla Hotel in Seoul, on July 15, 2007. On January 16, 2009, she gave birth to their first child, son Park Min-joon. On July 16, 2011, she announced that she was expecting her second child on MBC's Saebakhwi. In October 2011 she suffered a miscarriage. The cause for the miscarriage was reported to be a premature rupture of the amniotic fluids from oligohydramnios.

Filmography

Film

Television series

Web drama

Television shows

Hosting

Book 
 Park Kyung-lim, Cartoon Essay 《네모천사 경림이》(2001)  
 Park Kyung-lim, English Success Story (2004)  
 박경림의 사람 (2008)

Awards

References

South Korean musical theatre actresses
South Korean stage actresses
South Korean television actresses
South Korean television presenters
South Korean women television presenters
South Korean radio presenters
South Korean comedians
South Korean women comedians
South Korean web series actresses
Dongduk Women's University alumni
People from Seoul
1978 births
Living people
South Korean women radio presenters
Best Variety Performer Female Paeksang Arts Award (television) winners